Guiyang East railway station is a railway station on the Shanghai–Kunming high-speed railway, the Guiyang–Guangzhou high-speed railway and the Chongqing–Guiyang high-speed railway located in Wudang District, Guiyang, in the Guizhou province, China. This station opened on 2 November 2017.

Metro station
The railway station will be served by the planned Line S2 of Guiyang Metro.

See also
Guiyang North railway station

References 

Railway stations in Guizhou
Buildings and structures in Guiyang
Railway stations in China opened in 2017